Iuliu Andrei Hațiegan (born 4 April 1998) is a Romanian professional footballer who plays as a forward.

Personal life
He is a descendant of doctor Iuliu Hațieganu, the founder of Universitatea Cluj, the club where he started his career. He also sustains to be related to Zoltán Ivansuc, a former player of Universitatea Cluj.

Honours
Universitatea Cluj
 Liga III: 2017–18
 Liga IV: 2016–17

Minaur Baia Mare
Liga III: 2020–21

References

External links
 
 
 Iuliu Hațiegan at lpf.ro

1998 births
Living people
Sportspeople from Cluj-Napoca
Romanian footballers
Association football forwards
Liga I players
FC Politehnica Iași (2010) players
Liga II players
FC Universitatea Cluj players
CS Minaur Baia Mare (football) players
Liga III players